Lyndsay DePaul (born November 30, 1988) is an American swimmer.

Career

At the 2009 World University Games, DePaul won a silver medal in the 400 m individual medley and 200 m butterfly.  This last March, she finished 2nd in the 100 fly and 3rd in the 200 fly at the Women's NCAA Division 1 Championships.

At the 2010 Long Course National Championships, she finished 6th place in the 100 meter butterfly and 9th place in the 200 meter butterfly.  She finished the season being ranked 15th in the world in the 200 meter butterfly.

At the 2010 Short Course National Championships, she won her first national title in the 100 yard butterfly and was 2nd in the 200 butterfly behind her teammate, Katinka Hosszu.

External links

 
 
 

1988 births
Living people
American female swimmers
American female butterfly swimmers
American female medley swimmers
Swimmers at the 2011 Pan American Games
USC Trojans women's swimmers
Pan American Games silver medalists for the United States
Pan American Games medalists in swimming
Universiade medalists in swimming
Universiade silver medalists for the United States
Medalists at the 2009 Summer Universiade
Medalists at the 2011 Summer Universiade
Medalists at the 2011 Pan American Games